Eva Julia Augusta Ramstedt (15 September 1879 – 11 September 1974) was a Swedish physicist who specialized in radiology and studied under Nobel laureate Marie Curie. She was heavily involved in women's rights in academia and was among the founding members of an association for female academics now known as Kvinnliga Akademikers Förening. Due in part to the association's efforts, several legal changes were enacted that nudged Swedish female academics closer to having the same rights as their male colleagues, including a change to the Basic Laws of Sweden in 1909 and universal suffrage in 1921.

Education 

Ramstedt was  born in 1879, in Stockholm, Sweden to a family with notable socioeconomic capital due to her father, Johan Ramstedt's, work as a politician. She attended Uppsala University as an undergraduate and graduate student, and finished her doctorate on the properties of expanding liquids at Uppsala University in 1910. After earning her doctorate, Ramstedt studied under Marie Curie at Sorbonne University in Paris.

Career 

In 1903, Ramstedt returned to Sweden and began working at the Nobel Institute of Physical Chemistry. She was appointed to a radiology position at Stockholms högskola (Stockholm University College) in 1915 and continued there until 1932. However, as a woman she was not considered for a permanent professorship and taught classes there only briefly. Instead, she also took a position as a teacher of mathematics and physics at the Stockholm Folkskoleseminariet, a normal school (teacher training college), from 1919 to 1945.

Throughout her career, Ramstedt collaborated with many other scientists. Some of her most notable work was produced through her collaboration with Norway-based radiochemist Ellen Gleditsch. They studied radiology, specifically the half-life of radium. In 1917, they published a book on the subject called Radium och radioaktiva processer. As a result of her work, Ramstedt received the Illis quorum of the eighth degree in 1942.

References 

1879 births
1974 deaths
20th-century Swedish physicists
Swedish women physicists
Scientists from Stockholm
Uppsala University alumni
Recipients of the Illis quorum